Archewell Inc. is a Beverly Hills-based mix of for-profit and not-for-profit (public) business organizations registered in Delaware and founded in 2020 by Prince Harry, Duke of Sussex, and Meghan, Duchess of Sussex. The group includes the couple's nonprofit charitable foundation, as well as lucrative for-profit business divisions focusing on media production, Archewell Audio and Archewell Productions.

History

Sussex Royal

On July 1, 2019, Harry and Meghan registered a private company limited by guarantee in England and Wales under the title 'Sussex Royal The Foundation of The Duke and Duchess of Sussex', alternatively referred to as Sussex Royal Foundation. However, after a meeting with senior members of the British royal family, it was confirmed on February 21, 2020, that the couple would not use 'Sussex Royal' as a brand name after they stepped down as working royals at the end of March 2020. Even so, the namesake website remains visible online. On August 5, 2020, Sussex Royal Foundation was renamed 'MWX Foundation' and dissolved the same day.

Formation and trademarks

On March 3, 2020, an International Class 35 trademark application for the name 'Archewell' was submitted for registration with the United States Patent and Trademark Office (USPTO) by Cobblestone Lane LLC, which is registered in Delaware but linked to the Beverly Hills offices of Richard Genow, a lawyer who has worked for Meghan for years. A second logo with "the letters AW on top of each other" was registered under a different Delaware firm, IPHW LLC. The description of services for Trademark Class 35 'Advertising and Business' is advertising, business management, business administration and office functions. The Duke and Duchess reportedly "filed paperwork to create 'their own charity and volunteering services, wide-ranging website, and sharing 'education and training materials' via films, podcasts and books' and requested to trademark a number of things including motion picture films and branded objects."

On May 26, USPTO assigned an examiner to review the application, and an 'Irregularity notice' was reportedly sent "addressing a catalogue of errors, including the vague nature of the proposed charitable work, according to documents". Such notice read: 'The wording "providing a website featuring content relating to philanthropy, monetary giving, volunteer and career opportunities" in International Class 35 is also indefinite and over broad, and must be clarified to specify the nature of the content provided.' The notice allowed until August for changes to be made.

Archewell's website was "officially launched" in October 2020. Although it was reported in April 2020 that Archewell would focus on issues including "conservation, female empowerment, and gender equality", this had not been confirmed by the organization. At the end of December 2020, the website was updated to reflect the nature of their charitable and commercial endeavors.

In March 2021, it was reported that lawyers for the couple had blocked the trademark registration of Archewell Harvatera, a Philippine brand of tawas deodorant that had filed a trademark application in July 2020. In July 2021, the organization was told their trademark applications would require further revisions. Among them was requested clarification that the group's audio branch would provide  "entertainment-based services"; lawyers  were also asked to "specify the nature" of "live stage performances" included in its list of prospective activities. Their foundation was also asked to "define the kind of web apps they wish to provide" as listed in their purported functions.

In November 2021 and in parallel with the 2021 United Nations Climate Change Conference, the foundation announced they would become net zero by 2030.

Finances
According to the organization's spokesperson, Archewell had no financial activity in 2020 and its first bank account was opened in January 2021. The gross amount of money raised by the charity was around $50,000 in 2020. In January 2023, the organization published an impact report of its activities between 2020 and 2022. The foundation raised $13 million in its first year of operation, $3 million of which were donated to causes such as refugee resettlement, procuring COVID-19 vaccines, funding academic fellows, and supporting humanitarian relief centers. The rest of the money in reserve is expected to be donated in the future.

Etymology
In April 2020, Meghan and Harry confirmed that their US-headquartered non-royal foundation would be called 'Archewell'. The name stems from the Ancient Greek word 'Arche', which means 'source of action' compounded with the English word 'well'.

Taxonomy
The National Taxonomy of Exempt Entities (NTEE) is a classification system for non-profit organizations developed by the NCSS Archewell comes under 'NTEE T30 Public Organizations', which typically have grantmaking as a main focus.

Publicity and structure
In November 2020, former communications head at Pinterest and former Apple corporate communications manager, Christine Schirmer, was recruited for Archewell's publicity team. Others include Toya Holness, who led communications at the New York City Department of Education, and James Holt (Harry and Meghan's communications lead in the United Kingdom). It was reported that PR agency Sunshine Sachs will work with Schirmer, Holness and Holt as they oversee Archewell ventures. Holt later replaced Catherine St Laurent as the foundation's executive director in March 2021, while St Laurent remained affiliated with the organization as a senior adviser. Around the same time, Invisible Hand, a social impact agency founded by Genevieve Roth, started collaborating with Archewell on initiatives and campaigns, and Roth was appointed a senior strategic advisor. In June 2021, tech and media executive Mandana Dayani joined the foundation as its first chief operating officer. In September 2021, former Sony Pictures executive Fara Taylor was hired as head of marketing for all of the company's three divisions and she is expected to leave her position some time in 2023. In the same year, the company hired Miranda Barbot, a former employee of Barack Obama. In May 2022, Ashley Momtaheni Hansen, the VP of Global Communications and Media Relations at the Universal Filmed Entertainment Group, was named as the person who would lead Archewell's Global Communications. In the same month, Toya Holness left her position as head of communications. In September 2022, it was announced that Sunshine Sachs would no longer represent them.

In December 2022, Mandana Dayani, who had been the president of Archewell, resigned following a planned departure where the Duke and Duchess would come off of parental leave and jointly take over the role. In January 2023, Shauna Nep was named as co-executive director to work alongside executive director James Holt. Miranda Barbot joined the foundation as director of global communications and press secretary, while Maren Thomas was named manager of communications, and will work alongside Deesha Tank.

Charitable activities

Archewell Foundation
In December 2020, a partnership with José Andrés's World Central Kitchen was announced. Archewell agreed to fund four "Community Relief Centers" to act as "quickly activated service kitchens". The first was opened in Dominica in early 2021. The second is to be in Puerto Rico and the third in Mumbai, while the fourth location has not been advised.

In the same month, Archewell disclosed collaborations with multiple organizations. It was announced that Archewell had 'partnered' with neurosurgeon James Doty from Stanford University to support his center's research on "promoting altruism" in society. Other affiliations include the Loveland Foundation, which provides mental health resources to black women, and the Center for Humane Technology, which promotes ethical technology use.

Following a winter storm in North America in mid-February, which caused damage to several facilities, the foundation made a donation to the Genesis Women's Shelter in Dallas to cover the costs for the roof of the shelter's transitional facility. Archewell was one of the initial donors of the PressPad Charitable Foundation, which aims to "improve socio-economic diversity within the media". In March 2021, Archewell named the PressPad Charitable Foundation, along with the civil rights and racial justice organization Color of Change, the UK-based mental health charity Mind, and multi-platform network URL Media, as the organizations to which they would offer support. In May 2021, to mark the Mother's Day in the United States, the foundation together with Procter & Gamble made donations to Harvest Home, a charity that helps expectant mothers dealing with domestic violence, substance use and homelessness, providing them with diapers for a year and cleaning supplies. Later in the same month, the foundation announced a multi-year global partnership with Procter & Gamble to address issues related to "gender equality, more inclusive online spaces, and resilience and impact through sport".

In August 2021, to mark her 40th birthday, Meghan launched 40x40, a campaign that asks people around the world to spend 40 minutes of their time mentoring women reentering the workforce and combating the outsized economic impact of the COVID-19 pandemic on women. Among people who joined the initiative were Melissa McCarthy, Adele, Amanda Gorman, Ibram X. Kendi, and Gloria Steinem. In the same month the organization partnered with Women for Afghan Women to help with the evacuation of thousands of Afghan women and children during the 2021 Taliban offensive, while also assisting World Central Kitchen with delivering meals to hospitals and shelters for those affected by the 2021 Haiti earthquake. In December 2021 and ahead of Christmas, the foundation made donations to charities supporting Afghan families dislocated after the 2021 Taliban offensive and organizations advocating for paid parental leave, including Team Rubicon, the Human First Coalition and the Marshall Plan for Moms. In recognition of their support for Afghan refugees, the foundation received the Partner Organization Award by the Human First Coalition.

In February 2022, the foundation partnered with NAACP to offer the NAACP-Archewell Digital Civil Rights Award at the annual NAACP Image Awards to recognize leaders in technology and social justice who are making a difference. The award will be given along with a $100,000 prize. In March 2022 and to mark the Women's History Month, the foundation made grants to Smart Works, The 19th, the National Women's Law Center and the Center on Poverty and Inequality at Georgetown University Law Center. In the same month, Archewell invested in the People's Vaccine Alliance, a coalition made up of over 90 organizations that advocates for free global access to vaccines. Amid the 2022 Russian invasion of Ukraine, the foundation also made donations to charities that support Ukrainian people, including HIAS (Helping Ukrainian Families Settle), World Central Kitchen, the World Health Organization, the HALO Trust and Project Healthy Minds, as well as media platforms that fight against misinformation such as The Kyiv Independent and Are We Europe.

In April 2022, Archewell announced a partnership and offered grants to Cortico—Local Voices Network (from MIT Media Lab) and The Institute for Rebooting Social Media at Harvard's Berkman Klein Center for Internet & Society. In May 2022, the Marshall Plan for Moms announced the National Business Coalition for Child Care, which includes Archewell. The initiative aims to expand child care support for workers. In October 2022, the foundation announced a partnership with the VING Project, asking individuals between 14 and 18 to nominate inspiring women in need of financial assistance, who will be granted $1,000 each. In the same month, it was reported that the foundation had partnered with KaBOOM! and the City of Uvalde for the DeLeon Park playground project, which will see the building of a community play space for children and families recovering from the Robb Elementary School shooting. The foundation later announced donations to Save the Children and UNICEF Nigeria to assist communities affected by the 2022 Nigeria floods. In December 2022, the foundation announced a partnership with Robert F. Kennedy Human Rights to establish the Archewell Foundation Award for Gender Equity in Student Film. In March 2023 and to mark the International Women's Day, the foundation made a donation to the charity Harvest Home.

Archewell Foundation Fund
As of January 2021, "Archewell Foundation is establishing the Archewell Foundation Fund" to support the goals of the UCLA Center for Critical Internet Inquiry (C2I2) in the technology sector.

For-profit media ventures

Archewell Audio
In December 2020, it was reported that the founders had signed a multi-year business deal with Spotify to launch a podcast through audio-producing company, Archewell Audio, a subsidiary of Archewell Inc. Its first episode was released on December 29, 2020, with guests including Stacey Abrams, Christina Adane, José Andrés, Brené Brown, Rachel Cargle, Deepak Chopra, James Corden, Matt Haig, Sir Elton John, Hussain Manawer, Naomi Osaka, Tyler Perry, and George the Poet. In July 2021, it was reported that podcaster Rebecca Sananès had been hired as head of Archewell Audio. In January 2022, it was reported that Spotify had started efforts for expanding the couple's podcast team through "advertising for in-house staff" and hiring producers that would work with Archewell Audio via Gimlet Media. In the same month and following criticism aimed at Spotify for their handling of COVID-19 misinformation, Harry and Meghan made an announcement stating that since April 2021 they had begun "expressing concerns" about the issue on the platform. In March 2022 and amid "encouraging" conversations with Spotify on tackling misinformation, it was announced that Meghan's first podcast series would be launched in the summer of 2022. Archetypes premiered in August 2022.

Rebecca Sananès, who had been the head of Archewell Audio since July 2021, resigned in December 2022, and was replaced by Serena Regan.

Audio works

Archewell Productions
In September 2020, Harry and Meghan signed a commercial deal with Netflix "to develop scripted and unscripted series, film, documentaries, and children's programming for the streaming service". The program aims to "utilize the power of storytelling to embrace our shared humanity and duty to truth through a compassionate lens". In March 2021, it was reported that Ben Browning, president of FilmNation Entertainment, had been hired to lead the project and he would leave his position some time in 2023. He was followed by Chanel Pysnik, a former Disney+ executive hired to oversee nonfiction series and documentary film productions, as well as Bennett Levine, who joined the team as coordinator. Nishika Kumble, a former developer at Le Train Productions and 26 Keys Productions, was hired in August 2021 as senior vice president of scripted TV.

In April 2021, it was announced that the company's first project with Netflix would be Heart of Invictus, a documentary series in partnership with The Invictus Games Foundation which will be released in 2023. The project will surround the competitors from the 2020 Invictus Games, directed by Orlando von Einsiedel and produced by Joanna Natasegara. Harry will executive produce the series and appear on camera. Their second project, Pearl, was announced in July 2021. The animated series was originally pitched to Netflix in 2018. It would be about the adventures of a 12-year-old girl who is inspired by influential women from history. Meghan was set to executive producer the series alongside David Furnish, Carolyn Soper, Liz Garbus, Dan Cogan, and Amanda Rynda. Rynda would also serve as the showrunner. In May 2022, it was announced that Pearl had been canceled, but Harry and Meghan would still collaborate on future projects with Netflix.

In an interview published in October 2022, Meghan announced that she and Harry were working on a docuseries focused on their life, which is directed by Liz Garbus. On December 1, 2022, the title of the docuseries was announced as Harry & Meghan. The couple also served as executive producers and presenters for the docuseries Live to Lead, which was released on December 31, 2022. In February 2023, The Telegraph reported that for their future projects the couple would focus on "fictional, scripted content" and serve as executive producers for rom coms and "light-hearted" programs.

Filmography

References

External links

Meghan, Duchess of Sussex
Non-profit organizations based in the United States
Prince Harry, Duke of Sussex